Montague Close is a street in London, England, close to London Bridge in London SE1, within the London Borough of Southwark.

The Worshipful Company of Glaziers is located here. To the south are Southwark Cathedral and Borough Market.

The close is described in the Survey of London, Volume 22, Bankside (The Parishes of St. Saviour and Christchurch Southwark).

Gallery

References

Streets in the London Borough of Southwark
Southwark Cathedral